Yannick Gingras (born August 4, 1979, in Sorel, Quebec, Canada) is a Champion driver of Standardbred horses in the sport of harness racing.

Career awards and records
Gingras drove in his native Canada until 2001 when he moved to Yonkers Raceway in New York where he enjoyed immediate success, winning that fall's driving title. Following a 426 win year in 2003 that earned him the Dan Patch Rising Star Award, he relocated to Meadowlands Racetrack in 2004 which he continues to maintain as his home base.

In 2014, Yannick Gingras was voted American harness racing's Dan Patch Driver of the Year Award, and led all drivers in North America in purse money won in 2014 and 2015. In June 2016 he earned the 6000th win of his career at Pocono Downs and in August, the driver and trainer combination of Gingras and Hall of Fame inductee Jimmy Takter set a record when they won the Hambletonian Oaks together for the third consecutive year.

References

1979 births
Canadian harness racing drivers
American harness racing drivers
American Champion harness racing drivers
Dan Patch Award winners
Sportspeople from Quebec
Sportspeople from New Jersey
Canadian emigrants to the United States
Living people